The 2019 Nigerian House of Representatives elections in Akwa Ibom State was held on February 23, 2019, to elect members of the House of Representatives to represent Akwa Ibom State, Nigeria.

Overview

Summary

Results

Abak/Etim Ekpo/Ika 
A total of 13 candidates registered with the Independent National Electoral Commission to contest in the election. PDP candidate Aniekan John Umanah won the election, defeating APC Ekon Emmanuel and 11 other party candidates. John received 70% of the votes, while Emmanuel received 29.78%.

Eket/Onna/Esit Eket/Ibeno 
A total of 8 candidates registered with the Independent National Electoral Commission to contest in the election. PDP candidate Ifon Patrick won the election, defeating APC Akpabio Alex Kufre and 6 other party candidates. Patrick received 84.23% of the votes, while Alex received 15.44%.

Etinan/Nsit Ibom/Nsit ubium 
A total of 10 candidates registered with the Independent National Electoral Commission to contest in the election. PDP candidate Onofiok Luke won the election, defeating APC Akpan Daniel and 8 other party candidates. Luke received 73.73% of the votes, while Daniel received 25.99%.

Ikono/Ini 
A total of 7 candidates registered with the Independent National Electoral Commission to contest in the election. PDP candidate Emmanuel Ukpongudo won the election, defeating APC Idiong Effiong and 5 other party candidates. Ukpongudo received 72.94% of the votes, while Effiong received 26.98%.

Ikot Abasi/Mkpat Enin/Eastern Obolo 
A total of 9 candidates registered with the Independent National Electoral Commission to contest in the election. PDP candidate Francis Uduyok won the election, defeating APC Bernard Udoh and 7 other party candidates. Uduyok received 74.01% of the votes, while Udoh received 25.93%.

Ikot Ekpene/Essien Udim/ Obot Akara  
A total of 9 candidates registered with the Independent National Electoral Commission to contest in the election. PDP candidate Nsikak Ekong won the election, defeating APC Emmanuel Akpan and 7 other party candidates. Ekong received 57.36% of the votes, while Akpan received 42.38%.

Itu/Ibiono Ibom 
A total of 9 candidates registered with the Independent National Electoral Commission to contest in the election. PDP candidate Henry Archibong won the election, defeating APC Edet Ikotidem and 7 other party candidates. Archibong received 68.92% of the votes, while Ikotidem received 30.98%.

Oron/Mbo/Okobo/Udung Uko/Urue Offong/Oruko 
A total of 8 candidates registered with the Independent National Electoral Commission to contest in the election. PDP candidate Nse Ekpenyong won the election, defeating APC Victor Antai and 6 other party candidates. Ekpenyong received 52.85% of the votes, while Antai received 47.03%.

Ukanafun/Oruk Anam 
A total of 7 candidates registered with the Independent National Electoral Commission to contest in the election. PDP candidate Unyime Idem won the election, defeating APC Emmanuel Ukoette and 5 other party candidates. Idem received 74.75% of the votes, while Ukoette received 22.97%.

Uyo/Uruan/Nsit Atai/Ibesikpo Asutan 
A total of 15 candidates registered with the Independent National Electoral Commission to contest in the election. PDP candidate Michael Enyong won the election, defeating APC Ekerete Edem Ekpenyong and 13 other party candidates. Enyong received 83.60% of the votes, while Ekpenyong received 15.93%.

References 

Akwa Ibom State House of Representatives elections
House of Representatives
Akwa Ibom